Tomovick Nunatak is a nunatak along the southern side of the upper portion of Larsen Glacier, 9 nautical miles (17 km) west of Mount Gerlache in Victoria Land. Mapped by United States Geological Survey (USGS) from surveys and U.S. Navy air photos, 1956–62. Named by Advisory Committee on Antarctic Names (US-ACAN) for Donald S. Tomovick, U.S. Navy, utilitiesman at South Pole Station in 1966.

Nunataks of Victoria Land
Scott Coast